The 1994 NAIA Division II men's basketball tournament  was the tournament held by the NAIA to determine the national champion of men's college basketball among its Division II members in the United States and Canada for the 1993–94 basketball season.

Eureka defeated Northern State (SD) in the championship game, 98–95 in overtime, to claim the Red Devils' first NAIA national title.

The tournament was played at the Montgomery Fieldhouse at Northwest Nazarene University in Nampa, Idaho.

Qualification

The tournament field expanded for the first time, increasing by four teams from twenty to twenty-four teams. The top eight teams remained seeded and were all additionally given a bye into the second round. All other teams, meanwhile, were placed in the preliminary first round.

The tournament continued to utilize a single-elimination format.

Bracket

See also
1994 NAIA Division I men's basketball tournament
1994 NCAA Division I men's basketball tournament
1994 NCAA Division II men's basketball tournament
1994 NCAA Division III men's basketball tournament
1994 NAIA Division II women's basketball tournament

References

NAIA
NAIA Men's Basketball Championship
1994 in sports in Idaho